On 5 May 1998 a Boeing 737-282, leased from the Fuerza Aérea del Perú (Peruvian Air Force) and servicing a charter flight for Occidental Petroleum, crashed in rainy weather while on approach to Andoas, a town in Peru close to the border with Ecuador, killing 75 people on board; eleven passengers and two crew members survived.

Occidental Petroleum chartered the aircraft to transport workers to the Andoas oil field. The aircraft was registered as FAP-351 (c/n 23041 / m/n 962) and had only entered service with the Peruvian Air Force a few weeks before the crash.

Crash
The aircraft crashed around 21:30 local time while on an NDB approach to Alférez FAP Alfredo Vladimir Sara Bauer Airport at Andoas. The aircraft crashed  short of Andoas. It was scheduled to arrive at Andoas at 21:17 local time.

Medical teams were delayed more than a day in reaching the crash site due to poor weather, with the survivors being carried on stretchers in torrential rain to a medical post in Andoas because the weather prevented their evacuation by helicopter. Later, a Peruvian Air Force Boeing 737 rescue aircraft flew to Andoas, carrying a medical team, crash experts and police investigators.

References

Occidental Petroleum Boeing 737 crash
Accidents and incidents involving the Boeing 737 Original
Occidental Petroleum Boeing 737 crash
Aviation accidents and incidents in Peru
Occidental Petroleum Boeing 737 crash